Robinsonia dewitzi is a moth in the family Erebidae first described by Juan Gundlach in 1881. It is found in Mexico, Costa Rica, Guatemala, Trinidad, Cuba, the Dominican Republic, the Guyanas, Brazil, Venezuela, Paraguay, Peru and Ecuador.

References

Moths described in 1881
Robinsonia (moth)